Icon is the seventh album from Sheila E, released on Mooscious Records.

Track listing

 The U.S. Edition contains three additional songs: "Fiesta", "Born and Raised" and "Oakland N Da House".

References

2013 albums
Sheila E. albums